Clifton Satherley (18 March 1939 – 14 September 1961) was a New Zealand cricketer. He played in two first-class matches for Northern Districts from 1959 to 1961.

See also
 List of Northern Districts representative cricketers

References

External links
 

1939 births
1961 deaths
New Zealand cricketers
Northern Districts cricketers
Cricketers from Auckland